Kalsia was a princely state in Punjab, British India, one of the former Cis-Sutlej states. It was founded by Raja Gurbaksh Singh Sandhu in 1760. After India's independence, it was included in PEPSU and later in the Indian East Punjab after the States Reorganisation Act, 1956. The area of Kalsia is now located in the modern day Indian states of Punjab and Haryana. In 1940 the population of Kalsia was 67,393. Kalsia was ruled by Jat Sikhs.

Geography
The area of Kalsia was 435 km2 (168 sq mi), consisting of 20 detached pieces of territory in the Ambala and Ferozepur districts, lying mainly between 30° 12 and 30° 25 N and 77° 21 and 77° 35 E. It was divided into 3 major parts: two tehsils, Chhachhrauli and Basi, and a sub-tehsil named Chirak, in Ferozepur district. It had contained 181 villages in 1903. The capital of Kalsia state was Chhachhrauli.

History
The state of Kalsia was founded by Gurbaksh Singh in 1760. He joined the Kroria Misl of the Sikh Confederacy. Maharaja Ranjit Singh had granted the estate of Chhachhrauli to Raja Gurbaksh Singh, a commander of his troops and a resident of Kalsia village. Maharaja Goorbaksh Singh named the state "Kalsia" and Chhachhrauli became its capital city.

Raja Gurbaksh Singh was not famous, but his successor and son, Jodh Singh was an able person. At that time the area of Kalsia state comprised the territory between the Yamuna and the Markanda stream. Jodh Singh captured Dera Basi from Sardar Khajan Singh and also acquired territories of Lohal and Achrak. When Maharaja Ranjit Singh attacked and occupied Naraingarh in the Shivaliks in 1807, Jodh Singh was with him. In recognition of his services, Ranjit Singh presented him territories of Badala, Kameri and Chhabbal.

Jodh Singh died in Multan in 1818. After his death, his son Sobha Singh assumed charge of Kalsia state and held it until his death in 1858. Lahna Singh, his successor sided with the British in crushing the revolt of 1857.

After 1858,  a period of peace started. When Lahna Singh assumed power, the Kalsia territory was intact as a British protectorate. The state's annual income was nearly Rs 300,000 per annum, and the population was around 62,000. After Lahna Singh, came Ranjit Singh Kalsia, then his son Ravi Sher Singh, and finally Ravi Karan Singh. Ravisher Singh in 1916 gave himself the title of Raja.
The Kalsia rajas held their estate until 1947, when it was merged with the Indian Union.

Both Ranjit Singh Kalsia and Ravi Sher Singh built several public utility buildings, including a charity hospital and schools. Raja Ravi Sher Kalsia Hospital was inaugurated in 1910 by Lt Governor of the Punjab, Sir Luis William Daney. The old court building still exists at Chhachhrauli. The dewan of the state used to live in a building known as ‘Janak Niwas’. The Kalsias were undoubtedly staunch Nanakpanthis.

In volume XIX (Part 1) of the Census of India 1891, E. D. Maclagan, the Provincial Superintendent of Census Operation, records: "Some eighty years ago (i.e., in 1811 AD) the grandfather of the present Lambardar of Jainpur village was carried off by the Sikh chief of Kalsia, and had all his fingers burnt off, because he refused to acknowledge that Nanak was the true Guru."

The state was under the political control of the commissioner of the Delhi division. Kalsi is gotra of Dhiman and Ramgharia casts.

Rulers
The rulers of Kalsia State bore the title of 'Sardar', and Maharaja although from 1916 they adopted the title of 'Maharaja', including the last head of the state.

Sardar / kings 
1763 - 1785                Maharaja Gur Bakhsh Singh                    (d. 1785) 
1785 - 1818               maharaja Jodh Singh                          (b. 1751 - d. 1818) 
(1818 - 14 Feb 1858        Maharaja Sobha Singh                         (d. 1858) 
1858 - 19 Feb 1869       Maharaja  Lahna Singh                         (d. 1869) 
1869 - 10 Jul 1883       Maharaja  Bishen Singh                        (b. 1854 - d. 1883) 
1883 - 1886             Maharaja   Jagjit Singh                        (b. 1880 - d. 1886) 
28 Aug 1886 - 1908        Maharaja Ranjit Singh                        (b. 1881 - d. 1908) 
25 Jul 1908 - 1916         Maharaja Ravisher Singh                      (b. 1902 - d. 1947)

Kings and Queens (Raja and Rani )  
 1916 - 1947      Ravisher Singh

See also
Cis-Sutlej States
Political integration of India

References

Princely states of India
1763 establishments in India
1948 disestablishments in India